David Southall  is a British paediatrician who is an expert in international maternal and child hospital healthcare and in child protection including the diagnosis of the controversial Fabricated or Induced Illness (FII, also known as "Munchausen syndrome by proxy"), and who has performed significant research into Sudden Infant Death Syndrome (SIDS).

Early career
Prior to becoming a paediatrician, Southall spent four years in general adult medicine, one year in obstetrics and two years as a general practitioner.

International humanitarian work
In 1993, during the Bosnian War, Professor Southall was invited by the Overseas Development Administration of the British Government (now DFID) to visit Sarajevo to identify and evacuate children in need of urgent medical treatment which could not be provided locally because of armed conflict.
After this mission he was asked by UNICEF to become a consultant and lead a programme from 1993-1995 to help children in Mostar and in camps for internally displaced families in other areas of Bosnia.  Prompted by his experiences in Bosnia of what he described as "trauma inflicted on children and their families, not only by warring factions, but also by the indolence of the international community", Professor Southall established Child Advocacy International (CAI) on his return to the UK, to advocate for international child health issues. Since 2009, and in order to reflect the close involvement of CAI with the emergency care of pregnant women and adolescent girls, the charity was re- named Maternal and Childhealth Advocacy International (MCAI ).

Some of the main advocacy undertaken involved campaigns against the arms trade, healthcare in refugee camps and the development of the Maternal and Child Friendly Healthcare Initiatives (see below).  One particular success with advocacy involved the New Jalozai Afghan refugee camp where the Pakistan Government were encouraged by CAI to move the 70,000 refugees living in appalling circumstances into a more suitable camp.  The United Nations High Commission for Refugees (UNHCR) wrote a letter to Professor Southall thanking CAI for this achievement.

From 1999 to 2004 Professor Southall was Chairman of a working party developing the Child Friendly Healthcare Initiative (CFHI).   In addition to CAI, UNICEF UK, The Royal College of Paediatrics and Child Health and the Royal College of Nursing were parties to this work.

Since 2002, and following on to CAI’s work in Afghanistan and Pakistan, and in collaboration with a British Medical Education charity a program called “Strengthening Emergency Healthcare” involving Emergency Maternal, Neonatal and Child Healthcare (EMNCH) was established. The program was originally started in the Afghan refugee camps in Pakistan and has subsequently been developed in Pakistan with assistance from the local offices of the World Health Organization (WHO) and UNICEF.  In 2006, it was successfully introduced into The Gambia following a recommendation from WHO Geneva.  In November 2012 a similar programme was started in Liberia with financial support from THET and UKAID.

Additional programs of CAI and subsequently of MCAI involved apprenticeship based training in hospital care of pregnant women, newborn infants and children in Kosovo, Sri Lanka, Afghanistan, Uganda, The Gambia and Liberia. Throughout the last 20 years of this work, Professor Southall has been the Honorary Medical Director of CAI/MCAI and the lead in all of the above work.

Respiratory research and child protection work
Between 1979 and 1983 a large prospective investigation funded by the British Heart Foundation and the Medical Research Council was led by Professor Southall into the potential role of short episodes of absent breathing and heart rate and rhythm disorders in newborn infants. The study showed no evidence that these episodes in infants were related to subsequent SIDS leading to a major reversal of the role of apnoea monitors in SIDS prevention.

For his research work into SIDS, Professor Southall was given The Mary Gray and William W Cobey Award from the Sudden Infant Death Syndrome Institute in 1994, University of Maryland and in January 1995 the  Annenberg Center Apnea of Infancy Award.

In 1993, Professor Southall reported in the British Medical Journal a study investigating the performance of invasive procedures in the intensive care of infants and children.  This study revealed inadequate pain control and sedation for a high proportion of painful procedures and led to a national review of this problem.  As a consequence he was appointed chair of a working party of the British Paediatric Association to develop guidelines on the management of pain control in children in hospital in the UK.

Between 1986 and 1994, Professor Southall led a program of diagnostic and treatment based clinical work at the Royal Brompton Hospital in London, and the North Staffordshire Royal Infirmary in Stoke-on-Trent involving patients with unexplained life-threatening events from a wide area of the UK. This work, involving the police and social services departments, helped protect children from life-threatening episodes of Fabricated or Induced Illness (FII) mostly involving suspected intentional suffocation of infants and young children by one of their parents, usually the mother. Techniques  included the controversial covert video surveillance (CVS) in hospital of infant and child patients by police or specially trained nursing staff to observe the interactions of their parents with  the children. 
Surveillance revealed abuse in 33 of 39 suspected cases, with documentation of intentional suffocation observed in 30 patients. Poisonings (with disinfectant or anticonvulsant), a deliberate fracture, and other emotional and physical abuse were also identified under surveillance. Bleeding from the nose and/or mouth was reported in 11 of the 38 patients who had had episodes of near death and were undergoing CVS but in none of 46 controls. Four patients who had been subjected to recurrent suffocation before CVS suffered permanent neurologic deficits and/or required anticonvulsant therapy for epileptic seizures resulting from hypoxic cerebral injury. 
The 39 patients undergoing CVS had 41 siblings, 12 of whom had previously died suddenly and unexpectedly. Eleven of the deaths had been classified as sudden infant death syndrome (SIDS) but after CVS, four parents admitted to suffocating eight of these siblings. Other signs of serious abuse were documented in the medical, social, and police records of an additional 15 of the siblings.  
The project concluded in its report in the medical journal Pediatrics that “Induced illness is a severe form of abuse that may cause death or permanent neurologic impairment. It may be accompanied by other severe forms of abuse, may result in behavioural disorders, and may be accompanied by immeasurable suffering. Detection of this abuse requires careful history-taking; thorough examination of the health, social, and police records; and close and focused collaboration between hospital and community child health professionals, child psychiatrists, social workers, and police officers. Covert video surveillance (CVS) may help investigate suspicions and ensure that children are protected from additional abuse. When parents have failed to acknowledge that they have deceived health professionals, partnership with them in seeking to protect their children may be neither safe nor effective”.

The project attracted controversy for its methods and raised ethical implications. Critics argued that the desire of the implementers of CVS to observe the carers harming the children exposed the children to further abuse, that the betrayal of doctor-patient trust necessarily involved in the surveillance could cause harm to the subjects, and that "a diagnosis should lead to treatment, not punishment". However, Professor Southall and his team argued that the surveillance saved the lives of many of the children involved, and Professor Southall himself said that "By doing covert video surveillance we are betraying the trust of parents... but if a parent has been abusing his or her child in this way then the trust between child and parent has already gone."

The concerns of a campaigning group of parents accused of abuse, a small proportion of parents involved in the ventilator study described below and their advocates, including a woman who was imprisoned subsequently for conspiracy to abduct a child,  led to an investigation of Professor Southall’s child protection work, in particular covert video surveillance, by his employer the North Staffordshire Hospital.  The campaigning group called themselves MAMA (Mothers Against Munchausen syndrome by proxy Allegations). The investigation by his employing hospital cleared Professor Southall.

In the early 1990s, Professor Southall led a randomised controlled study which pioneered continuous negative extrathoracic pressure therapy (CNEP), a non-invasive treatment for breathing difficulties in infants and young children involving the application of negative pressure to the patients' chests. The technique was found to reduce the duration of chronic lung disease in premature newborn infants and to reduce the need for intensive care in infants with bronchiolitis, a common and dangerous chest infection. This study was criticised by the MAMA campaigning group described above, with some parents of the children involved suggesting that the treatment was linked to subsequent death or brain injury of their children. Based on these allegations, the research was also the subject of investigations by the North Staffordshire Hospital which again found no wrongdoing or harmful effects of the treatment. An independent follow-up study concluded in 2006 that there was "no evidence of disadvantage, in terms of long-term disability or psychological outcomes" from the use of the technique.  The infants treated were all very premature babies in whom mortality and morbidity was expected, but there were no differences between study infants and control infants in this regard in the independent follow up study conducted. The long "saga" to discredit the researchers, perpetuated by constant media exposure, caused “widespread unpredictable damage”.

In November 2005, Southall retired from Keele University and his honorary status as professor there came to an end; they did not award him an emeritus professorship (for reasons given that this was no longer in their procedures). However, he continued to work as a Professor of Paediatrics at the University Hospital of North Staffordshire NHS Trust with his patients admitted by the hospital under this title.

General Medical Council Investigations
The same campaigning group (MAMA) also complained about the randomised controlled trial of CNEP to the General Medical Council (GMC) who many years later in 2008 investigated Professor Southall and two colleagues at a fitness to practice hearing.  The hearing was brought to a premature end when it was revealed that the evidence put forward by the campaigners was incorrect.

In 2004, following more complaints  from the MAMA campaign and Mr Clark, Professor Southall was found guilty of serious professional misconduct by the General Medical Council (GMC), after alleging to a police child protection officer that the husband of Sally Clark, a mother wrongly convicted of murdering two of her babies, was himself almost certainly responsible for murdering the couple's children. The children were later found to have died from natural causes based on withheld medical evidence  Professor Southall made the claim in confidence to a child protection officer of the Staffordshire police after watching a television documentary about the case as he was concerned about the safety of the surviving child. He subsequently presented his evidence to a formally convened child protection case conference, members of which expressed their view at a GMC hearing that his input was important. Despite this a GMC panel banned Professor Southall from child protection work for three years. The Council for Healthcare Regulatory Excellence challenged the decision as insufficient and argued that he should be deregistered, but a High Court of Justice decision in 2005 held that the sanction was not unduly lenient.
In the General Medical Council’s (GMC) subsequent publication: Protecting children and young people: the responsibilities of all doctors July 2012 and active 3 September 2012, there is the following statement:  “You must tell an appropriate agency, such as your local authority children’s services, the NSPCC or the police, promptly if you are concerned that a child or young person is at risk of, or is suffering, abuse or neglect unless it is not in their best interests to do so (see paragraphs 39 and 40). You do not need to be certain that the child or young person is at risk of significant harm to take this step. If a child or young person is at risk of, or is suffering, abuse or neglect, the possible consequences of not sharing relevant information will, in the overwhelming majority of cases, outweigh any harm that sharing your concerns with an appropriate agency might cause”.

In February 2007, The Attorney-General Lord Goldsmith, following further campaigning by the MAMA group, announced that a review would be held into a number of criminal cases in which Southall had given evidence for the prosecution, following allegations that his hospital department had kept up to 4,450 separate case files containing specialist clinical data on child patients mainly  referred from other hospitals and including some child protection cases. These were kept separate from the standard hospital records but with a link to them which was fully known by hospital administrators. This investigation revealed no evidence that Professor Southall’s actions had harmed criminal investigations.

On 4 December 2007, Southall was struck off the medical register after being found guilty of professional misconduct by the General Medical Council  in another child protection case. Southall appealed against this decision in the High Court, but the appeal was dismissed. In his judgment, Mr. Justice Blake stated that Southall "had speculated on non-medical matters in an offensive manner entirely inconsistent with the status of an independent expert." However, this ruling was subsequently overturned by the Court of Appeal in 2010.  Neither the GMC Panel nor Mr. Justice Blake understood the importance of the presence of an independent senior social worker during the interview with the mother who had brought the complaint to the GMC.   The mother, who was part of the long-standing MAMA campaign against his child protection work described above, complained that Professor Southall had accused her of murdering her son. Professor Southall denied this.  The senior social worker present and taking notes throughout the interview gave evidence that the mother’s allegation was incorrect and also denied that Professor Southall had made the accusation.

On 1 June 2009 Professor  Southall was the subject of an episode of the BBC's current affairs program Panorama, title 'A Very Dangerous Doctor'.  This programme raised serious concerns about the way in which his child protection work had been investigated and damaged by the GMC and other inappropriate inquiries. The interest group 'Professionals Against Child Abuse' subsequently commented in the medical journal The Lancet that the "GMC should never have brought this case" (against Southall) and criticised disciplinary proceedings brought against other doctors involved in child protection work.

On 4 May 2010 Professor Southall was back on the medical register after winning his action in the Court of Appeal ending a long-running dispute with the General Medical Council. The Appeal Court's decision meant that he was able to practice medicine again.

In September 2011 the GMC dropped its last remaining case against Professor Southall involving the issue of the special case files raised by the campaigning group MAMA and Attorney General in 2007 (see above) Professor Southall stated that this final closure of the GMC case in September 2011 was a "victory over an orchestrated and dangerous campaign which has waged war over 16 years against my work in trying to protect children from life threatening abuse". He is continuing to request that the GMC apologise for its misguided approach to his work and for breaching his right to a fair trial within a reasonable time.

Recent work

In November 2010 Professor Southall organised an international conference for the International Child Health Group of the Royal College of Paediatrics and Child Health in the UK on the effects of armed conflict on healthcare.  A resolution was drawn up following this meeting which is recorded on a website called the International Health Protection Initiative (IHPI) where organisations can sign up and support its aims ultimately relating to protection of healthcare staff and facilities.  International organizations that have signed up include the International Pediatric Association. The IHPI is now formally part of two international groups trying to address the effects of armed conflict on health care.

In 2011 Professor Southall was also invited to be the key note speaker for The David Harvey Lecture an annual UK Neonatal Update in London which was published as a paper.

In 2012, Professor Southall was elected a member of the Ray E Helfer Society, a prestigious organisation of child protection specialists based in the USA whose mission is to help prevent and reduce the harm resulting from child maltreatment, by advancing the work of physicians in the areas of education, clinical care, research and advocacy.

In 2013 Professor Southall was invited to be the Editor of a special issue covering global child abuse and child protection in the medical journal “Paediatrics and International Child Health” 

Finally between 2010 and 2014, Professor Southall has been the Editor of a recently published (October 2014) 921 page textbook.  This book includes chapters written and reviewed by over 100 experts from around the world and addresses the hospital care of pregnant women and girls, newborn infants and children in poorly resourced countries.  The textbook is published by Radcliffe Publishers of Oxford and is being distributed to as many as possible frontline health workers (particularly those in rural hospitals where the internet is inadequate) free of charge.

Honours and awards
Southall received an OBE in 1999 for services to childcare in Bosnia and Hercegovina.

References

Bibliography 
 Leila Schneps and Coralie Colmez, Math on trial. How numbers get used and abused in the courtroom, Basic Books, 2013. . (First chapter: "Math error number 1: multiplying non-independent probabilities. The case of Sally Clark: motherhood under attack").

Year of birth missing (living people)
Living people
Academics of Keele University
20th-century English medical doctors
Place of birth missing (living people)
British paediatricians
Factitious disorders
21st-century English medical doctors
Officers of the Order of the British Empire